Shamsabad (also Romanized as Shamsābād; also known as Shamshābād) is a village in Ekhtiarabad Rural District, in the Central District of Kerman County, Kerman Province, Iran. At the 2006 census, its population was 55, in 18 families.

References 

Populated places in Kerman County